Foster and Laurie is a 1975 made-for-TV movie. It is the story of two NYPD officers, Gregory Philip Foster and Rocco W. Laurie, who were murdered while on patrol in the East Village, Manhattan, New York City in 1972.

Production and cast notes
Foster and Laurie originally aired on November 13, 1975 on CBS. It was based in the 1974 book of the same name by Al Silverman.

Talia Shire, who plays the widow, Adelaide Laurie, was at the time between her roles in The Godfather and Rocky.

References

External links

1975 television films
1975 films
1975 drama films
American television films
Films directed by John Llewellyn Moxey
Black Liberation Army
New York City Police Department
American police officers killed in the line of duty
Crimes in New York City